Arthur Posnansky (1873–1946), often called "Arturo", was at various times in his life an engineer, explorer, ship’s navigator, director of a river navigation company, entrepreneur, La Paz city council member, and well known and well respected avocational archaeologist. During his lifetime, Posnansky was known as a prolific writer and researcher and for his active participation in the defense and development of Bolivia. He is well known for his books, including Tihuanacu, the Cradle of American Man, Campana de Acre, La Lancha "Iris", Die Osterinsel und ihre praehistorischen Monumente, and Razas y Monumentos Prehistóricos del Altiplano Andino. Many, if not most, of his theories have been rejected by modern scholars.

Early life 
He was born in Vienna, Austria, on April 13, 1873. He helped his father in his business as a manufacturing chemist. At this time, he was deeply involved in cognate studies. His interest in cognate studies ended when his father suddenly died. After his father's death, Posnansky studied at the Imperial and Royal Academy of Pola (now Pula) for the position of Naval Military Engineer in the Austro-Hungarian Navy. During his time in the Imperial and Royal Academy of Pola, he made several extensive training voyages, which took him many places, including the Easter Islands in the South Pacific Ocean, as a part of his shipboard training. While on Easter Island, he made ethnological observations, which he later published as Die Osterinsel und ihre praehistorischen Monumente. Posnansky graduated from the Imperial and Royal Academy of Pola at age 18.

Life in Brazil 
At age 23 in 1896, Posnansky emigrated to South America. At first, he participated in various expeditions, which explored upper reaches of the Amazon River. During these expeditions, he became an experienced navigator of it and its tributaries. He used his expertise to become the director of a river navigation company, which was called La Empresa de Navegacao dos rios Purus e Acre. As captain and owner of the shallow-draught steamer and blockade runner, Iris, Posnansky rescued the survivors of the Acre garrison during the Acre Campaign in Brazil. After being wounded and captured by Brazilian forces, he escaped and became a refugee in Europe. Because of his loyalty to and support of Bolivia in this conflict, he lost all of his properties in Brazil. His exploits during the Acre Campaign (1900-1901) are detailed in his book Campaña del Acre: la lancha "Iris"; aventuras y peregrinaciones

Life in Bolivia
After being a refugee in Europe, Posnansky moved to Bolivia to claim compensation for his services to this country. After finding that any substantial reward was unattainable because of the bankrupt state of the Bolivian treasury, he devoted his talents towards building private businesses involved in mining and international trade. In time, he became a prosperous entrepreneur. During this time, Posnansky introduced the first car to Bolivia. Posnansky died in La Paz, Bolivia in 1946.

While his business ventures thrived, the Bolivian Government recognized Posnansky's service during the Acre Campaign. For his sacrifices in support of the Bolivian government, it first granted him the honorific title of Benemerito de la Patria (Worthy of the Nation) and full Bolivian citizenship. Later, it awarded him two gold medals, one in 1901, the other in 1903. In 1905, his government service continued when he was elected to La Paz City Council.

Research
After settling in Bolivia, Posnansky repeatedly traveled the Bolivian and Peruvian highlands in efforts to locate, describe, and study Inca and pre-Inca archaeological sites. He was especially interested in those found along the shoreline and on the islands of Lake Titicaca. The results of these investigations were published in books such as The Islands of Titicaca and Koati and Rasas y monumentos prehistoricos del Altiplano Andino. For such research, the Bolivian Senate awarded him a gold medal in 1905 and he later became Director of the National Museum. He also authored books, which included Os Indios Paumaris e Ipurinas no rio Purus (1898) and Mapa del rio Acre (7 volumes, 1897), about South American geography and ethnology. He also lectured about archaeological subjects in Berlin, Frankfort, Nuremberg, and Treptow, Germany. In recognition of his accomplishments, the German Government conferred on him an honorary title of Professor in 1914.

Posnansky's final and most important book, Tihuanacu, the Cradle of American Man, was published in 1945 (volumes I and II) and 1957 (volumes III and IV). In it, Posnansky argued that Tiwanaku was constructed approximately 15,000 BC by American peoples, although not by the ancestors of those then living in the area, the Aymara. Posnansky also saw Tiwanaku as the origin point of civilization throughout the Americas, including the Inca, the Maya and others. Since the publication of the work, these ideas have since been disputed by later archaeological research. However, the photographs, detailed descriptions of structures and inscriptions, meticulously prepared maps, and numerous photographs found in this work constitute an extremely valuable historical record of the site. Posnansky's ideas about Tiwanaku having been a full-fledged city with a large permanent population, rather than only a seasonally occupied ceremonial center, and its abandonment having been the result of prehistoric climatic change are widely accepted in principle. This book and his personal efforts also contributed significantly to the eventual preservation of the site at a time when it was being very badly damaged by neglect, stone-quarrying, and looting.

References

Additional references
Ponce Sangines, C. (1999) Arthur Posnansky:

External links
 Posnansky, A. 1945. | Tihuanaco Cuan Del Hombre Americano  (Vol. 1, Spanish & English.)

1873 births
1946 deaths
Engineers from Vienna
Emigrants from the Austro-Hungarian Empire to Brazil
20th-century Bolivian historians
Bolivian archaeologists
20th-century Bolivian businesspeople
Andean scholars
Austro-Hungarian engineers